Eucalyptus clelandiorum, commonly known as Cleland's blackbutt is a species of mallet that is endemic to the South West region of Western Australia. It has hard, black, crumbly bark on the lower half of its trunk, smooth bark above, narrow lance-shaped adult leaves, flower buds arranged in groups of seven, nine or eleven, white flowers and cup-shaped fruit.

Description
It has hard, black, crumbly bark on about the lower half of the trunk, and smooth pale grey to pinkish bark above. Flowering mainly occurs from August to November and the flowers are white.

Taxonomy
Cleland's blackbutt was first formally described in 1911 by Joseph Maiden who gave it the name Eucalyptus goniantha var. clelandiorum and published the description in the Journal of the Natural History and Science Society of Western Australia. In 1912, Maiden raised the variety to species status in his book A Critical Revision of the Genus Eucalyptus. 

The specific epithet (clelandiorum) honours "Mr. A.F. Cleland, Civil Engineer of Kurrawang" and his nephew, "Dr. J. Burton Cleland". (Maiden published the name as Eucalyptus clelandi but indicated that the name honoured two men. The name is therefore corrected to Eucalyptus clelandiorum, in accordance with Article 60.8 of the Shenzhen Code.)

Distribution
Eucalyptus clelandiorum mostly grows in open woodland from east of Cue to near Lake Biddy in the Avon Wheatbelt, Coolgardie, Great Victoria Desert, Murchison and Yalgoo biogeographic regions of Western Australia.

Conservation status
This mallet is classified as "not threatened" by the Western Australian Government Department of Parks and Wildlife.

See also
List of Eucalyptus species

References

clelandiorum
Endemic flora of Western Australia
Mallees (habit)
Myrtales of Australia
Eucalypts of Western Australia
Plants described in 1911
Taxa named by Joseph Maiden